The 2016 Kansas Jayhawks football team represented the University of Kansas in the 2016 NCAA Division I FBS football season. The Jayhawks were led by second year head coach David Beaty. They played home games at Memorial Stadium and were members of the Big 12 Conference.

The Jayhawks entered the season with a 15-game losing streak overall, which ended with a 55–6 win over Rhode Island, They also entered the season with 12 consecutive losses within the Big 12, which expanded to 19 during the season and ended with their 24–21 win over Texas. The win over Texas was Kansas's first win over Texas since 1938. The Jayhawks also entered the season with a 35-game road losing streak dating back to a 34–7 win against UTEP during the 2009 season, which was expanded to 40 losses during the season.  The Jayhawks were picked 10th in the Big 12's preseason poll, receiving 25 of the possible 26 last place votes.

The Jayhawks returned senior safety Anthony "Fish" Smithson who led the nation in solo tackles.

The Jayhawks finished the season 2–10, 1–8 in Big 12 play to finish in last place.

Schedule

Schedule Source:

Game summaries

Rhode Island

Ohio

at Memphis

at Texas Tech

TCU

at Baylor

Oklahoma State

at Oklahoma

at West Virginia

Iowa State

Texas

at Kansas State

Roster

References

Kansas
Kansas Jayhawks football seasons
Kansas Jayhawks football